Argoed is a village in Shropshire, England, on the border with Wales. The name itself is Welsh and means "by a wood", and probably derives from early medieval times when it lay in the Kingdom of Powys.

External links

Villages in Shropshire